John Grayson House is a historic home located near Graysontown, Montgomery County, Virginia.  The house was built about 1850, and is a  two-story, three-bay, frame dwelling with a single pile central passage plan. It has a two-story ell and a standing seam metal roof.  Its front facade features a two-story pedimented porch containing a circular louvered vent in the gable.  Also on the property is a tall frame smokehouse with a stone foundation and a pyramidal standing-seam metal roof.

It was listed on the National Register of Historic Places in 1989.

References

Houses on the National Register of Historic Places in Virginia
Houses completed in 1850
Houses in Montgomery County, Virginia
National Register of Historic Places in Montgomery County, Virginia